Jonathan Swan (born 7 August 1985) is an Australian journalist who works as a political reporter for Axios. He won an Emmy Award in 2021 for his interview with then-US president Donald Trump.

Early life
Swan was born and raised in Australia. He is Jewish. Swan is the son of physician, journalist, and radio and television broadcaster Norman Swan; his aunt and uncle are also Australian journalists. He graduated from Sydney Grammar School in Sydney. In Australia, he entered the field of journalism in 2010. He later moved to the United States, and in 2014 held a yearlong fellowship with the American Political Science Association before returning to journalism in 2015 and remaining in the U.S.

Career
Swan began his career as a national political reporter based in Canberra, Australia's capital city, for Fairfax Media and as a political correspondent for The Sydney Morning Herald. He joined The Hill in August 2015 as part of their campaign team.

Swan became a national political reporter for Axios in December 2016. While at Axios, Swan broke several stories about the Trump administration. Former Washington Post journalist Ronald Kessler claimed in his 2018 book The Trump White House: Changing the Rules of the Game that Swan is among a handful of reporters to whom President Donald Trump feeds information, with instructions to attribute quotes to an unnamed White House official.

Swan was the first to report that the U.S. would pull out of the Paris climate deal; that Steve Bannon was about to be fired; that Trump would recognize Jerusalem as Israel's capital; and that Trump would end the Deferred Action for Childhood Arrivals executive action policy. Swan broke the news that the Speaker of the House Paul Ryan was retiring from Congress. In September 2018, Swan reported on Axios that Deputy Attorney General Rod Rosenstein had resigned. Rosenstein remained in his post, and it later emerged that he had offered a letter of resignation that was not accepted. Axios clarified the article, and Swan wrote on Twitter that he "“screwed up by giving it a certainty it didn’t warrant”.

In August 2020, Swan was praised by people on social media for the manner in which he had conducted an interview with President Trump. During the interview, Swan pointedly questioned and fact-checked numerous false, misleading, or bizarre statements as the President spoke them. The New York Times media columnist Ben Smith wrote that Swan's was "perhaps the best interview of Mr. Trump’s term."

In November 2022, The New York Times announced Swan would start working there from January 2023 covering the US Congress, focusing on the Republican Party.

Controversy 
In March and April 2019, HuffPost and Wired reported that Axios had paid a firm to improve its reputation by lobbying for changes to the Wikipedia articles on Axios and Swan.

Recognition
As a member of the Sydney Morning Herald in the Canberra Press Gallery, Swan was presented with the Wallace Brown Award in 2014 for most outstanding young journalist. In 2016, Politico named Swan one of "16 Breakout Media Stars." In 2020, The Jerusalem Post named Swan in its list of the world's 50 most influential Jews. In 2021, Axios was awarded an Emmy Award in the Best Edited Interview category for "President Donald J. Trump - An Interview" by Jonathan Swan, who accepted the award. The White House Correspondents' Association presented Swan the 2022 Aldo Beckman award for "overall excellence in White House coverage."

Personal life 
He married American reporter Betsy Woodruff of Politico on September 14, 2019. They have one child. He had stated that he intends to become an American citizen.

References

Australian political journalists
Australian expatriate journalists in the United States
1985 births
Living people
Australian people of Scottish-Jewish descent
21st-century Australian journalists
The Sydney Morning Herald people